Moca chelacma is a moth in the family Immidae. It was described by Edward Meyrick in 1927. It is found on Samoa. Its type locality is Malololelei on the island of Upolu.

References

Moths described in 1927
Immidae
Endemic fauna of Samoa
Taxa named by Edward Meyrick
Moths of Oceania